Addison Street is a major east–west street on the north side of Chicago and its western suburbs. Wrigley Field is located at 1060 West Addison Street, which is the home of the Chicago Cubs.

Chicago communities
From east to west:
Lake View (City of Chicago)
North Center (City of Chicago)
Avondale (City of Chicago)
Irving Park (City of Chicago)
Portage Park (City of Chicago)
Dunning (City of Chicago)

Transportation
Addison Street is primarily served by the 152 Addison between Inner Drive and Cumberland Avenue. The southbound 94 California also serves a short segment between Rockwell Street and California Avenue.

The following CTA Lines service Addison Street
Red Line at Sheffield Avenue
Brown Line at Ravenswood Avenue
Blue Line at Kennedy Expressway

Points of interest 
 The Chicago Police Department's historic Town Hall Police Station is located at the intersection of Addison and Halsted Streets. The police department has recently moved into a larger facility next door, and the building is being turned into senior housing.
 Wrigley Field, the home of the Chicago Cubs is located on Addison between Clark Street and Sheffield Avenue in the heart of Wrigleyville.
 Wrigleyville is the neighborhood centered on the stadium and is full of Cubs related stores, restaurants and bars. The most famous one is The Cubby Bear located directly across the street on Addison from the stadium.
 At the intersection of Addison and Western is Lane Tech High School one of the city's oldest, largest and top performing schools.
 Addison passes by the Villa District between Avondale Avenue and Pulaski Road.
 The historic Schurz High School is located at the intersection of Addison and Milwaukee and is well known for its architecture. It is an officially designated Chicago Landmark.

Major intersections

References

External links

Streets in Chicago
Chicago Cubs